Susan Schmidt is a journalist.

Susan Schmidt may also refer to:

Susan Schmidt Bies, member of the Board of Governors of the Federal Reserve System
Susan Ray Schmidt, memorist and anti-polygamy activist
Susan Schmidt of Chi-Pig